Apache Marmotta is a linked data platform that comprises several components. In its most basic configuration it is a Linked Data server. Marmotta is one of the reference projects early implementing the new Linked Data Platform recommendation that is being developed by W3C.

It has been contributed by Salzburg Research from the Linked Media Framework, and continues its versioning, hence starting at version 3.0.0.

Since April 2013, it is listed among the Semantic Web tools by the W3C.

In November 2020, it was retired to the Apache Attic, meaning that the project is no longer being developed.

Components 
The project is split in several parts: the platform itself, which includes full Read Write Linked Data, SPARQL, LDP, Reasoning, and basic security. In addition to the platform, the project develops some libraries can also be used separately:

 KiWi, a Triplestore built on top of a relational database.
 LDPath, a path language to navigate across Linked Data resources.  
 LDClient, a Linked Data client that allows retrieval of remote resources via different protocols by making use of pluggable adapters (data providers) that wrap other data sources (such as YouTube and Facebook).
 LDCache, a cache system that automatically retrieves resources by internally using LDClient.

History

Linked Media Framework (pre-Apache) 
Apache Marmotta is the continuation of the open source Linked Media Framework published in early 2012.

Apache Marmotta 
 On November 16, 2012 it is proposed to the Apache Software Foundation under the name of Apache Linda, later changed to Apache Marmotta in order to avoid confusion with the Linda language.
 On 3 December 2012 Marmotta enters incubation.
 On April 26, 2013 Marmotta 3.0.0-incubating is released.
 On October 3, 2013 Marmotta 3.1.0-incubating is released.
 In November 2013, it graduated as top-level project.
 In April 2014, the project released its first actual release under the umbrella of the Apache Software Foundation: 3.2.0 version.
 On 5 December 2014, the project published the version 3.3.0.

Notable users 
 The backend of Salzburger Nachrichten's search and archive is powered by Marmotta.
 Enel uses Marmotta for its Open Data portal.
 The cloud infrastructure of Redlink is powered by Marmotta.
 It is being used by some European research projects such as Fusepool and MICO (Media in Context).
 Digital Public Library of America uses Marmotta to run LDP server and RDF repository.
 WordLift uses Marmotta as Linked Data backend.

Bibliography

References

External links 
 
 Marmotta Incubation Proposal
 Apache Marmotta presentation
 Apache Marmotta on the W3C

Marmotta
Cross-platform software
Free software programmed in Java (programming language)
Semantic Web
Triplestores